Duigan is a surname. Notable people with the surname include:

Harry Duigan (1875–1931), Australian footballer
John Robertson Duigan (1882–1951), Australian aviator
John Duigan (born 1949), Australian film director
John Evelyn Duigan (1883–1950), New Zealand major general
Mike Duigan, Australian politician
Nick Duigan (born 1984), Australian footballer
Nick Duigan (politician), Australian politician
Suzanne Duigan (1924–1993), Australian paleobotanist